Long Lake Seaplane Base  is a privately owned, public use seaplane base on Long Lake in Cumberland County, Maine, United States. It is located one nautical mile (2 km) northeast of the central business district of Naples, Maine.

Facilities and aircraft 
Long Lake Seaplane Base has one seaplane landing area designated 16/34 with a water surface measuring 15,000 by 3,960 feet (4,572 x 1,207 m). For the 12-month period ending August 13, 2010, the airport had 260 general aviation aircraft operations, an average of 21 per month.

See also 
 Long Lake Seaplane Base (Sinclair, Maine) at

References

External links 

 Aerial image as of April 1998 from USGS The National Map
 

Airports in Cumberland County, Maine
Seaplane bases in the United States
Naples, Maine